Roosevelt Williams, Jr. (born September 10, 1978) is a former American football cornerback of the National Football League. He was drafted by the Chicago Bears in the third round of the 2002 NFL Draft, 72nd overall. He received a football scholarship to Florida State University. But due to being academically ineligible, he attended Tuskegee University.

Early years
Roosevelt stayed in the crime-infested housing projects on the East side of Jacksonville, where he and current NFL running back Leon Washington were neighbors. Roosevelt decided to attend Terry Parker High School (Jacksonville, Florida); which is 15 miles from his neighborhood; Williams felt the transition would keep him focus and out of trouble. At Terry Parker High School he lettered in football, basketball and track.

College career

At Tuskegee University he was considered one of the top five cornerbacks in the nation for the NFL draft. He was also arguably considered the best collegiate defender in the state of Alabama in 2002. He played college football at Tuskegee in which he is considered the best cover cornerback to ever wear the crimson and old gold. Williams collegiate success of being drafted from a small division II have paid the way for current and former NFL players Drayton Florence, Frank Walker (American football), Dimitri Patterson and Harry Williams (American football) who were drafted in the years after him. Williams made All-American and first team SIAC all of his four years at a historical black university.

Professional career

Chicago Bears
Williams was selected in the third round of the 2002 NFL Draft. The pick used was obtained by the Bears from the Dallas Cowboys. Due to a nagging ankle injury he suffered in training camp, Williams played 7 games in his rookie season starting in three. Week 13 Chicago missed a big opportunity on the last play of the half. Packers QB Brett Favre threw a hail mary pass at the end of the half that was intercepted by Bears SS Damon Moore. Moore fumbled the ball to Packers lineman Mike Wahle, who subsequently fumbled it again to Williams. Packers rookie receiver Javon Walker chased Williams down and tackled him short of the end zone to end the half. Bears CB R. W. McQuarters had a chance to make the block but attempted to position himself for a lateral instead, allowing Walker to make the tackle at the 11-yard line to end the first half. The wild play made headlines in the Chicago daily news, ESPN, and the Pardon the Interruption show when sports columnist Michael Wilbon criticized R. W. McQuarters for such a selfish act that caused Williams not to score. 
Week 14 Williams made his first start against the AFC champions the New York Jets and was the player of the game that stop the Jets from progressing to the 2002 playoffs.

Denver Broncos
Williams was claimed off waivers from the Denver Broncos. The Broncos made room for Williams by cutting third-string quarterback Danny Kanell leaving just two quarterbacks on the Broncos roster. Week 3 against the San Diego Chargers starting quarterback Jake Plummer injured his shoulder during a Chargers sack which resulted in the release of Williams to make room for another quarterback. A couple days after the release, Williams was picked up by the Cleveland Browns.

Cleveland Browns
Williams played in a total of 12 games for the Browns starting in 3. With the Browns Williams was on a secondary unit that were ranked #3 in pass defense and #10 in total defense. In week 13 Cleveland Browns faced the Denver Broncos which was considered the game of the week that went in overtime. Williams finished that game with 8 tackles and a couple of break ups.

Coaching career
In 2019, Williams was appointed the head football coach at ASA College in Hialeah, Florida.

References

External links
 Hardin–Simmons profile
 Seton Hill profile

1978 births
Living people
American football cornerbacks
ASA Miami Silver Storm football coaches
Chicago Bears players
Clark Atlanta Panthers football coaches
Cleveland Browns players
Denver Broncos players
Hardin–Simmons Cowboys football coaches
New York Jets players
Savannah State Tigers football players
Seton Hill Griffins football coaches
Southwest Baptist Bearcats football coaches
Tuskegee Golden Tigers football players
Widener Pride football coaches
Terry Parker High School alumni
Coaches of American football from Florida
Players of American football from Jacksonville, Florida
African-American coaches of American football
African-American players of American football
21st-century African-American sportspeople
20th-century African-American sportspeople